Margarett Williams Sargent (August 31, 1892 – 1978) was a noted painter in the Ashcan School and a follower of George Luks. She exhibited as Margarett Sargent and Margarett W. McKean.

Biography
Margarett Williams Sargent was born on August 31, 1892, on Commonwealth Avenue, Boston, the daughter of Francis Williams Sargent (1848–1920) and Jane Welles Hunnewell (1851–1936). She was a distant relative of John Singer Sargent.

Sargent attended Miss Porter's School. 
After breaking a first engagement with Eddie Morgan, who was not accepted by her family, she trained as a sculptor in Italy, but later turned to watercolors and oils. She had her first show in New York in 1926, and later in Boston and Chicago. 
She was a student of Gutzon Borglum and George Luks. 
In 1919, Luks portrayed her by memory in The White Blackbird. Frederic Clay Bartlett, who courted her, sketched her in Paris; in the 1930s the sketch hung in Bartlett's house at 1301 Astor Street, Chicago.

Her granddaughter, Honor Moore suggests she may have had an affair with her New York roommate, Marjorie Davenport. Fanny Brice lived downstairs to them. Sargent became friends with gallerist Betty Parsons, a friendship that would last for life. Another friend was socialite Vivian Pickman.

In 1920, Margarett Sargent married Quincy Adams Shawn Mckean (November 1, 1891 – August 1971), a polo player from an old Boston family. The courtship had begun in 1912, at Sargent's debut ball. In 1920 Shawn Mckean bought the Samuel Corning House in Beverly, Massachusetts. The house was listed on the National Register of Historic Places in 1990. They had four children in three years: Q.A. Shaw Jr, Margarett "Margie", Jenny and Harry. In 1941 Margarett McKean (1922-2013) married Wally Reed. In 1944 Jenny McKean, married the Right Reverend Paul Moore Jr. and their daughter is author Honor Moore. In 1949 Margarett McKean remarried to Barclay H. Warburton III (divorced in 1959), the step-son of William Kissam Vanderbilt II. In 1952 Q.A. Shaw McKean, Jr., married Linda Huntington Borden, the daughter of John C. Borden. In 1966 Margarett McKean remarried to Stephen B. Vernon.

She was friends with Berenice Abbott, who took her portrait in Paris in 1928.

During her marriage, Sargent had both male and female lovers, and her husband as well had female lovers. One of Sargent's lovers was heiress Isabel Pell. Sargent said that Isabell was "handsome, wonderfully handsome". Pell used to visit Sargent at her Prides Crossing, Beverly, Massachusetts mansion, and was well known by both Sargent's husband, Quincy Adams Shaw McKean, and children, who called Pell "cousin Pell". Another male lover of Sargent was a young John Walker, who was to become the director of the National Gallery in Washington.

Sargent was an alcoholic and a frequent patient in sanitariums and received electroconvulsive therapy. After divorcing her, Mckean married Katherine Winthrop, whom he had met while still married to Sargent.

Margarett Williams Sargent died in 1978.

Exhibitions
"Sculptures and Water Colors", C.W. Kraushaar Art Galleries, March 1926
"One Woman Show", 38 paintings, Chicago Arts Club, 1930
"One Woman Show", C.W. Kraushaar Art Galleries, January 1931
"Painting and Sculpture from 16 American Cities", December 11, 1933 – January 7, 1934, The Museum of Modern Art
"Margarett Sargent": The Bold and the Beautiful, March 25, 2017, Cape Ann Museum

Legacy
In 1996 Sargent's granddaughter, Honor Moore, published The White Blackbird: A Life of the Painter Margarett Sargent by Her Granddaughter.

References 

1892 births
1978 deaths
American socialites
20th-century American painters
20th-century American women artists
American women painters
Artists from Boston